The CWA World Middleweight Championship was a professional wrestling middleweight championship in Catch Wrestling Association (CWA). The title was one of the two weight-based titles in CWA, along with the CWA World Junior Heavyweight Championship, which was introduced in 1993. The title was created in December 1984 and a tournament was set up to determine the inaugural champion. Tony St. Clair won the tournament to become the inaugural World Middleweight Champion on December 22, 1984. The title was deactivated when the company closed on December 4, 1999. The championship was contested under 12 three-minute rounds.

Title history

Combined reigns

References

Catch Wrestling Association championships
Middleweight wrestling championships